John Climping (died 18 May 1262) was a medieval Bishop of Chichester.

Life

Climping was a clerk of Ranulf of Wareham by 18 July 1220. By 1232 he was a canon of Chichester Cathedral and was named Archdeacon of Chichester by December 1242. He was then Chancellor of Chichester by 17 July 1247 as well as rector of Climping. He was elected to the see of Chichester on 20 May 1253, and consecrated on 11 January 1254 at Canterbury.

Climping died on 18 May 1262.

Notes

Citations

References

Further reading

 

1262 deaths
Bishops of Chichester
Archdeacons of Chichester
13th-century English Roman Catholic bishops
Year of birth unknown
People from Climping